Kaya Cattouse (born 12 December 1990) is a Belizean racing cyclist. She is a six-time national champion, winning three time trial titles and three road race titles.

Major results
Source: 

2014
 1st  Time trial, National Road Championships
2015
 2nd Road race, National Road Championships
2016
 1st  Road race, National Road Championships
2017
 National Road Championships
2nd Road race
2nd Time trial
2018
 National Road Championships
1st  Time trial
2nd Road race
2019
 National Road Championships
1st  Time trial
1st  Road race
2021
 National Road Championships
2nd Road race
2nd Time trial
2022
 1st  Road race, National Road Championships

References

External links

1990 births
Living people
Belizean female cyclists
Place of birth missing (living people)